John G. McKay (born January 16, 1886) was an American football, basketball, and baseball coach. He served as the head football and basketball coach at Butler University in Indianapolis, Indiana.

Head coaching record

Football

References

1886 births
Year of death missing
Butler Bulldogs baseball coaches
Butler Bulldogs football coaches
Butler Bulldogs men's basketball coaches
Westminster Titans football players
People from Franklinville, New York